Merrow (from Irish , Middle Irish  or ) is a mermaid or merman in Irish folklore. The term is of Hiberno-English origin.

The merrows supposedly require a magical cap (Hiberno-English: cohuleen druith) in order to travel between deep water and dry land.

Overview
The term appears in two tales set in Ireland published in the 19th century: "Lady of Gollerus", where a green-haired merrow weds a local Kerry man who deprives her of the "magical red cap"; and "The Soul Cages" where a green-bodied grotesque male merrow entertains a fisherman at his home under the sea.

These tales with commentary were first published in T. C. Croker's Fairy Legends (1828). William Butler Yeats and others writing on the subject borrowed heavily from this work. "The Soul Cages" turned out not to be a genuine folktale, but a piece of fiction fabricated by Thomas Keightley.

A number of other terms in Irish are used to denote a mermaid or sea-nymph, some tracing back to mythological tracts from the medieval to the post-medieval period. The Middle Irish  is a siren-like creature encountered by legendary ancestors of the Irish (either Goidels or Milesians) according to the  Book of Invasions. A , literally "sea-wanderer", is the term for the mermaid .

Etymology
Current scholarship regards merrow as a Hiberno-English term, derived from Irish  (Middle Irish  or ) meaning "sea singer" or "siren". But this was not the derivation given by 19th century writers.

This "Gaelic" word could also denote "sea monster", and Croker remarked that it was cognate with Cornish , a "sea hog". Yeats added  as an alternative original, as that word is also synonymous with mermaid.

The Middle Irish , (from  +  "chant, song") with its singing melodies that held sway over seamen was more characteristic of the sirens of classical mythology, and was imported into Irish literature via Homer's Odyssey.

Synonyms
These are Old or Middle Irish words, and usage are attested in medieval tracts. Other modern Irish terms for mermaid are given in O'Reilly's dictionary (1864); one of them,  ("sea-maiden"), being the common term for "mermaid" in Irish today (cf. de Bhaldraithe's dictionary, 1959).

Strictly speaking, the term  in the  example signifies "mermaid's melody". However, O'Clery's Glossary explains that this was rhetorically the "name of the nymphs that are in the sea". Croker also vaguely noted that  has been used by "romantic historians" in reference to the "sea-nymphs" enountered by Milesian ships.

Folk tales
Thomas Crofton Croker's Second Volume to the Fairy Legends (1828) laid the groundwork for the folkloric treatment of the merrow. It was immediately translated into German by the Brothers Grimm. Croker's material on the merrow was to a large measure rehashed by such authors on the fairy-kind as Thomas Keightley, John O'Hanlon, and the poet William Butler Yeats. A general sketch of the merrow pieced together by such 19th century authors are as follows.

Characteristics
The merrow-maiden is like the commonly stereotypical mermaid: half-human, a gorgeous woman from waist up, and fish-like waist down, her lower extremity "covered with greenish-tinted scales" (according to O'Hanlon). She has green hair which she fondly grooms with her comb. She exhibits slight webbing between her fingers, a white and delicate film resembling "the skin between egg and shell".

Said to be of "modest, affectionate, gentle, and [benevolent] disposition," the merrow is believed "capable of attachment to human beings," with reports of inter-marriage. One such mixed marriage took place in Bantry, producing descendants marked by "scaly skin" and "membrane between fingers and toes". But after some "years in succession" they will almost inevitably return to the sea, their "natural instincts" irresistibly overcoming any love-bond they may have formed with their terrestrial family. And to prevent her acting on impulse, her  (or "little magic cap") must be kept "well concealed from his sea-wife".

O'Hanlon mentioned that a merrow may leave her outer skin behind in order to transform into other beings "more magical and beauteous",  But in Croker's book, this characteristic isn't ascribed to the merrow but to the merwife of Shetlandic and Faroese lore, said to shed their seal-skins to shapeshift between human form and a seal's guise (i.e., the selkie and its counterpart, the ). Another researcher noted that the Irish merrow's device was her cap "covering her entire body", as opposed to the Scottish Maid-of-the-Wave who had her salmon-skin.

Yeats claimed that merrows come ashore transformed into "little hornless cows". One stymied investigator conjectured this claim to be an extrapolation on Kennedy's statement that sea-cows are attracted to pasture on the meadowland wherever the merrow resided.

Merrow-maidens have also been known to lure young men beneath the waves, where afterwards the men live in an enchanted state. While female merrows were considered to be very beautiful, the mermen were thought to be very ugly.  This fact potentially accounted for the merrow's desire to seek out men on the land.

Merrow music is known to be heard coming from the farthest depths of the ocean, yet the sound travels floatingly across the surface. Merrows dance to the music, whether ashore on the strand or upon the wave.

Merrow-men
While most stories about merrow are about female creatures, a tale about an Irish merman does exist in the form of "The Soul Cages", published in Croker's anthology. In it, a merman captured the souls of drowned sailors and locked them in cages (lobster pot-like objects) under the sea. This tale turned out to be an invented piece of fiction (an adaptation of a German folktale), although Thomas Keightley who acknowledged the fabrication claimed that by sheer coincidence, similar folktales were indeed to be found circulated in areas of Cork and Wicklow.

The male merrow in the story, called Coomara (meaning "sea-hound"), has green hair and teeth, pig-like eyes, a red nose, grows a tail between his scaly legs, and has stubby fin-like arms. Commentators, starting with Croker and echoed by O'Hanlon and Yeats after him, stated categorically that this description fitted male merrows in general, and ugliness ran generally across the entire male populace of its kind, the red nose possibly attributable to their love of brandy.

The merrow which signifies "sea maiden" is an awkward term when applied to the male, but has been in use for a lack of a term in Irish dialect for merman. One scholar has insisted the term macamore might be used as the Irish designation for merman, since it means literally "son of the sea", on authority of Patrick Kennedy, though the latter merely glosses macamore as designating local inhabitants of the Wexford coast. Gaelic (Irish) words for mermen are  "mermaid-man" or  "man of the sea".

Cohuleen druith
If they lose this cap, it is said that they will lose their power to return beneath the water.

This rendering is echoed by Kennedy who glosses this object as "nice little magic cap".

Arriving at a different reconstruction, Croker believed that it denoted a hat in the a particular shape of a matador's "", or in less exotic terms, "a strange looking thing like a cocked hat," to quote from the tale "The Lady of Gollerus". A submersible "cocked hat" also figures in the invented merrow-man tale "The Soul Cages".

Croker did point out that the merrow's hat shared something in common with "feather dresses of the ladies" in two Arabian Nights tales. However, he did not mean the merrow's hat had feathers on them. As other commentators have point out, what Croker meant was that both contained the motif of a supernatural woman who is bereft of the article of clothing and is prevented from escaping her captor. This is commonly recognized as the "feather garment" motif in swan maiden-type tales. The  was also considered to be of red color by Yeats, although this is not indicated by his predecessors such as Croker.

An analogue to the "mermaid's cap" is found in an Irish tale of a supernatural wife who emerged from the freshwater Lough Owel in Westmeath, Ireland. She was found to be wearing a salmon-skin cap that glittered in the moonlight. A local farmer captured her and took her to be his bride, bearing him children, but she disappeared after discovering her cap while rummaging in the household.

The Scottish counterpart to the merrow's cap was a "removable" skin, "like the skin of a salmon, but brighter and more beautiful, and very large", worn by the Maid-of-the-wave. It was called in Scottish Gaelic cochull, glossed as 'slough' and "meaning apparently a scaly tail which comes off to reveal human legs", though it should be mentioned that a cochull in the first instance denotes a piece of garment over the head, a hood-cape.

The "fishtail-skin" mermaid folklore (as well as that of "seal-skin" seal-woman/selkie) are found all over the Irish and Scottish coasts.

Medieval writings
It did not escape the notice of 19th century folklorists that attestations of  occur in Irish medieval and post-medieval literature, although they have been somewhat imprecise in specifying their textual sources.

Croker's remark that "the romantic historians of Ireland" depicted  (synonym of merrow) playing round the ships of the Milesians actually leads to the Book of Invasions, which recounts siren-like  encountered by legendary ancestors of the Irish people while migrating across the Caspian Sea.

The Annals of the Four Masters (17th cent.), an amalgamation of earlier annals, has an entry for the year 887 that reports that a mermaid was cast ashore on the coast of Scotland (Alba).

Invasions of Ireland
Wax ear-plugs for the shipmates prescribed by Caicher the Druid proved to be an effective prophylactic.

Even though Caicher the Druid is present in either case, different sets of voyagers, generationally-shifted from each other are engaged in actions with the sirens, depending on the variant text groups.

These  resemble sirens defeated by Odysseus to such a degree, "Homeric influence" is plainly evident.

The medieval scribes of  eschewed physical descriptions.
In this wise are those seamonsters, with the form of a woman from their navels upwards, excelling every female form in beauty and shapeliness, with light yellow hair down over their shoulders; but fishes are they from their navels downwards. They sing a musical ever-tuneful song to the crews of the ships that sail near them, so that they fall into the stupor of sleep in listening to them ; they afterwards drag the crews of the ships towards them when they find them thus asleep, and so devour them...

Dindsenchas 
One tale explains how the demise of Roth son of Cithang by mermaids in the Ictian sea (English Channel) gave birth to the name  (now Co. Waterford). "Port of the Thigh" it came to be called where his thigh washed ashore. The mermaids here are described as beautiful maidens except for their hill-sized "hairy-clawed bestial lower part" below water. While one text group only goes as far as to say the mermaids dismembered Roth,  alternate texts says that they devoured him, so that only the thigh bone drifted ashore.

Thus, like the mermaids in O'Clery's version, the half-beautiful mermaids here sang sleep-inducing "burdens" or musical refrains, tore their victims apart, and ate them.

It purports a woman named Ruad who rowed out to the estuary was lulled to sleep by the "mermaid's melody" and drowned in the spot, which received its name after her.

Rúad lay with the beautiful women, but he made an empty promise to carry on their tryst. The women arrived by boat to exact vengeance on Rúad, but frustrated, slew two of his sons instead, including the child one of them had borne. The episode is also embedded in the story The Wooing of Emer of the Ulster Cycle.

Popular culture 
 Merrow have appeared in the core rules of various classic editions of the Dungeons & Dragons role-playing game. They are essentially just aquatic ogres, and thus only the brutish male merrow of real-world mythology are properly represented therein.
 In the Magic: The Gathering card game, "Merrows" are a type of merfolk, native to the plane of Lorwyn/Shadowmoor. They are friendly, white/blue-aligned freshwater merchants, healers, and guides, dwelling in the clear streams of the "sunny" aspect of the plane (Lorwyn), and mischievous, blue/black-aligned brackish water looters and assassins dwelling in the bogs of the "dusk" aspect of the plane (Shadowmoor).
Unlike , Merrow has a pink hair and a more haughty look. A pink mermaid is the first mermaid to appear in the  games, that predate the Puyo Puyo games.
 Jennifer Donnelly's fantasy series the Waterfire Saga has an ancient mermaid ruler in its mythology named Merrow. Merrow was the first  in the fictional place of Miromara in the series.
 In the Harry Potter tie-in book Fantastic Beasts and Where to Find Them, merrows are said to be one of three subspecies of merpeople, along with Scottish selkies and Greek sirens.
 In Kentaro Miura's manga Berserk, Merrow are the name given to a race of mer-folk.
 In Jess Kidd's "Things in Jars", the merrow is a pale girl with eyes that change color between white and black. She has sharp, fish like teeth, and frequently bites. Her bite is fatally poisonous to men, but not women. She also has some control over water, and causes the river in London to rise, threatening a flood. She attracts snails and newts, which she eats.

See also
 Mermaid
 Merman
 Selkie

Notes

Explanatory notes

Citations

Bibliography

General

(III. Note on the River Ailbhiné gives text and translation of Book of Ballymote version, followed by notes).

Aos Sí
Fairies
Fantasy creatures
Irish folklore
Irish legendary creatures
Mermaids
Scottish folklore
Tuatha Dé Danann